His Highness The Rajah's College is an autonomous educational institution in the town of Pudukkottai in Tamil Nadu, India. Founded by Ramachandra Tondaiman, the Raja of Pudukkottai State in 1857, it is the foremost arts and science college in the town. It is affiliated with Bharathidasan University.

History
H.H. The Rajah's College, which was first established in the year 1857, as Maha Rajah's free English medium school, has now attained the supreme state of being an esteemed institution with real potential and the state of eminence and excellence.

The Maharaja Free English school
The Maharaja Free English school produced its first batch of matriculation students in 1880 and started its first intermediate courses in 1891. The Free English Medium School started functioning in the year 1879 in a spare building at Vadakku (North) Raja Street in Pudukkottai. The first batch of the final year students of this school were sent for the terminal exam. to the Madras University in the year 1880. Because of this 1880 is being considered as the beginning year of this college. In the year 1891, the high school classes and the college classes were transferred to this present building. The Head Master of the Maharajah Free English Medium School Mr. S. Narayanaswamy Ayyar was appointed as the first principal of this college.

PUC College
During the tenure of Mr. S. T. Ramachandra Sasthiri, as the Principal (1912 – 1920) courses like history, chemistry, mathematics, accountancy, Tamil and Sanskrit were taught to the students. In the year 1920, after the introduction of the science subjects in the Madras University at PUC Level, this college attained the state of self sufficiency to some extent. In the year 1921, a boy's hostel was built at the southern side of the college play ground. In order to provide  vocational training (technical skills) to the students, motor rewinding course was offered in 1928. Later, this course was changed into two years technical course for producing the engineering graduates.

Madras University affiliation
In the Year 1946, the Welfare Committee of the Madras University granted permission to this college to start the UG Courses. Then the subjects like Economics, History, and Mathematics were taught at the UG Level. The college started functioning as the first UG Degree College, affiliated to Madras University, in the year June 1946. Pudukkottai Samasthanam (The Kingdom of Pudukkottai) was annexed with the Trichy District in Madras Presidency in the year 1948. Since then the college, under the control of the Director of People's Education, Madras Presidency was declared as the Government College. B.Com. Degree Course was started in 1949.

In 1959, Chemistry was introduced as an elective subject in the UG Science Degree Courses. In addition to it, separate buildings with One Lakh, were built for the Physics and Chemistry Laboratories. B.Sc. Physics and B.Sc. Botany Degree Courses were started in the year 1961 and 1968 respectively. In the year 1968, M.Com. Degree Course was started in the college. And so the college was promoted as the First-Grade PG College of Pudukkottai. B.A. English was first started in the year 1980. Subsequently, M.A. History and M.Sc. Mathematics were introduced in  1981 and 1982 then in 1984, B.Com. degree course was offered in the Evening College Stream

Bharathidasan University affiliation
H.H. The Rajah's College was affiliated to the Bharathidasan University Trichirappalli in 1982. A sum of Rupees Two Lakhs was spent for building the compound wall around the college playground. From the academic year 1989–1990, M.Phil. Course was offered in Both M.Com. and M.A. (History) Degree Courses. Because of this the college attained another glorious mile stone in its pursuit of growth and development. M.A. Economics and B.Sc. Physical Education courses were started between 1990 and 1991. Ph.D. Full Time course was introduced in the department of History between 1992 and 1993. B.Sc. Computer Science was offered in 1996.

Autonomous accreditation
H.H.The Rajah's College was declared as an Autonomous College by the University Grants Commission in the academic year 1999–2000. The college which was awarded the 3 Star Status by the National Assessment and Accreditation Council (NAAC) between 1999 and 2000, was then declared as the "B" Grade College by NAAC between 2005 and 2006. Later in 2011, University Grants Commission was given the extension offer of Autonomy to this campus.

Departments
This college offers more than 20 degrees in different concentrations. Every faculties were working as research faculty in this campus. Each departments were governed by respective head of the departments.
The various departments of specialization are:
 Botany
 Business Administration
 Chemistry
 Commerce
 Computer Science
 Economics
 English
 Hindi
 History
 Mathematics
 Physical Education
 Physics
 Tamil
 Zoology.

Courses
H.H. The Rajah's College awarding more than 30 graduation degree's in various concentrations as follows,
 Bachelor of Arts (Tamil)
 Master of Arts (Tamil)
 Master of Philosophy (Tamil)
 Bachelor of Arts (English)
 Master of Arts (English)
 Master of Philosophy (English)
 Bachelor of Arts (Economics)
 Master of Arts (Economics)
 Master of Philosophy (Economics)
 Bachelor of Arts (Hindi)
 Master of Arts (Hindi)
 Bachelor of Arts (History)
 Master of Arts (History)
 Master of Philosophy (History)
 Bachelor of Commerce 
 Master of Commerce
 Bachelor of Business Administration
 Bachelor of Computer Applications
 Bachelor of Science (Computer Science)
 Master of Science (Computer Science)
 Master of Philosophy (Computer Science)
 Bachelor of Science (Maths)
 Master of Science (Maths)
 Master of Philosophy (Maths)
 Bachelor of Science (Physics)
 Master of Science (Physics)
 Master of Philosophy (Physics) 
 Bachelor of Science (Chemistry)
 Master of Science (Chemistry)
 Master of Philosophy (Chemistry)
 Bachelor of Science (Botany)
 Master of Science (Botany)
 Master of Philosophy (Botany)
 Bachelor of Science (Zoology)
 Master of Science (Zoology)
 Master of Philosophy (Zoology)
 Bachelor of Physical Education
 Master of Physical Education

Notable alumni
 S. Satyamurti was an Indian independence activist and politician. He was acclaimed for his rhetoric and was one of the leading politicians of the Indian National Congress from the Madras Presidency.
 Muthulakshmi Reddy was an Indian medical practitioner, social reformer and Padma Bhushan award receiver. Muttulakshmi Reddy was appointed to the Madras Legislative Council in 1927.
 Gemini Ganesan better known by his stage name Gemini Ganesan, was an Indian film actor who worked mainly in Tamil cinema. He was sports_nicknamed "Kadhal Mannan" (King of Romance) for the romantic roles he played in Tamil films.
 U. Sagayam is an Indian civil servant who currently serves as Vice Chairman of Science City Chennai. He is an IAS officer in the Tamil Nadu cadre, noted for his anti-corruption activities.

External links
 

Education in Pudukkottai district
1857 establishments in India
Colleges affiliated to Bharathidasan University
Academic institutions formerly affiliated with the University of Madras